Gašpar is a Slavic surname, cognate to Gaspar (given name). Notable people with this surname include:

 Alojz Gašpar (1848–1919), known in Hungarian as Alajos Gáspár, Hungarian-Slovene writer
 Đuro Gašpar (1900–1981), Croatian athlete
 Josip Gašpar (born 1973), Croatian footballer
 Jozef Gašpar (born 1977), Slovak football player
 Renato Gašpar (born 1977), Croatian alpine skier
 Robert Gašpar (born 1981), known in Australia as Robert Gaspar, football player
 Tibor Gašpar (born 1962), Slovak politician

As a given name, it can refer to:

 Gašpar Perušić (died 1507), 15th century Croatian nobleman

Slovene-language surnames
Croatian surnames
Slovak-language surnames
Croatian masculine given names